The 2002 NCAA Division II football season, part of college football in the United States organized by the National Collegiate Athletic Association at the Division II level, began on September 7, 2002, and concluded with the NCAA Division II Football Championship on December 14, 2002 at Braly Municipal Stadium in Florence, Alabama, hosted by the University of North Alabama. The Grand Valley State Lakers defeated the Valdosta State Blazers, 31–24, to win their first Division II national title.

The Harlon Hill Trophy was awarded to Curt Anes, quarterback from Grand Valley State.

Conference changes and new programs

Conference standings

Conference summaries

Postseason

The 2002 NCAA Division II Football Championship playoffs were the 29th single-elimination tournament to determine the national champion of men's NCAA Division II college football. The championship game was held at Braly Municipal Stadium in Florence, Alabama for the 15th time.

Playoff bracket

See also
 2002 NCAA Division I-A football season
 2002 NCAA Division I-AA football season
 2002 NCAA Division III football season
 2002 NAIA football season

References